The Bic Conglomerate Formation is a geologic formation in Quebec. It preserves fossils dating back to the Cambrian period.

See also

 List of fossiliferous stratigraphic units in Quebec

References
 

Cambrian Quebec
Cambrian southern paleotemperate deposits